The Peter J. McGovern Little League Museum—formally the World of Little League: Peter J. McGovern Museum and Official Store—is located on the Little League International Complex on Route 15 in South Williamsport, Pennsylvania, United States.  The museum offers interactive exhibits for children of all ages.  In addition, patrons can learn about the history of Little League Baseball.  The museum chronicles the growth of Little League from one, three-team league in 1939 to the multi-national youth sporting organization that it is today. Howard J. Lamade Stadium and Little League Volunteer Stadium are located directly behind the museum.

Hall of Excellence

The museum maintains a Hall of Excellence, established in 1998, to honor former Little League players who "have demonstrated a commitment to excellence in their chosen profession and exemplify the values learned as children in Little League."

Source:

See also
Little League Baseball#Awards

References

External links
Museum webpage. Little League official website
Hall of Excellence webpage. Little League official website

Little League
Baseball museums and halls of fame
Baseball in Williamsport, Pennsylvania
Sports museums in Pennsylvania
Halls of fame in Pennsylvania
Museums in Lycoming County, Pennsylvania
1982 establishments in Pennsylvania